Grodner is a surname. Notable people with the surname include:

Allison Grodner, American director, producer and writer
Annetta Grodner, Ukrainian Jewish singer and actress, the first prima donna in Yiddish theater
Israel Grodner (1848–1887), one of the founding performers in Yiddish theater
Nahum Grodner (1811–1879), preacher and philanthropist